In June 2012, France toured Argentina to play two Tests against the Pumas. The French tour was one in a series of tours by northern teams to be hosted by southern hemisphere nations.

The previous French tour of Argentina took place in 2010 as part of a global Two Test tour of South Africa and Argentina, where France lost to both nations. France's last winning tour of Argentina dated back to 1998 when the touring side claimed victory in both Tests. Since then France had an overall losing record against Argentina with 5 wins (4 at home and 1 in Ireland in the 1999 Rugby World Cup) and 7 losses (3 at home including two in the 2007 Rugby World Cup and 4 in Argentina).

No mid-week fixture had been planned for this tour, however most of the French squad, styled for the occasion as the "XV du Président", played a warm-up fixture against a team hand-picked by Serge Betsen, a former France international, for his jubilee.

The series was drawn 1-1, Argentina winning the first test and France the second.

Argentina and France's next encounter took place on 17 November 2012 on French soil as part of the 2012 end of year tests. France claimed another victory (39-22) against their old foes.

Background
Argentina experienced a strong start in the 2011 Rugby World Cup with a rather successful pool stage, finishing runners-up to England with three wins (over Georgia, Romania and Scotland) and a narrow loss to England (9-13). However, the Pumas were unable to capitalise on it when they met future World Champions the All Blacks in the quarter-finals, losing 33-10.

France, on the other hand, experienced a rather slow start in the competition with two wins (over Japan and Canada) and two losses (to New Zealand and Tonga), finishing runners-up to New Zealand on the virtue of a greater tally of bonus points than Tonga (who also finished with two wins and two losses). However, France produced a stronger showing in the knock-out stages, beating England in the quarter-finals (19-12), Wales in the semi-finals (9-8) and losing with the narrowest of margins to New Zealand in the final (8-7).

Due to the World Cup neither team played any Test in the 2011 end of year tests. On 2 January 2012 France was ranked 3rd in the IRB World Rankings while Argentina stood in the 7th place.

France experienced a disappointing 2012 Six Nations Championship with two wins (over Italy and Scotland), two losses (to England and Wales) and a draw (with Ireland), finishing 4th overall.

As a result on 2 April France had dropped to the 6th place in the IRB Rankings while Argentina remained on the 7th spot.

As part of Italy's Summer Tour of Americas and prior to the arrival of the French team, Argentina played a Test against Italy on Saturday 9 June in San Juan. Argentina won the game 37-22.

Before the first test between France and Argentina they remained respectively on the 6th and 7th spot in the IRB Rankings.

Warm-up fixture

 6 players from the XV du Président (all among the replacements) were not originally included in the French squad that toured Argentina. Arnaud Héguy, Yannick Forestier, Alexandre Flanquart, Damien Chouly, Florian Cazenave and Henry Chavancy respectively replaced Christopher Tolofua, Vincent Debaty, Yoann Maestri and Christophe Samson, Louis Picamoles, Morgan Parra and Wesley Fofana and Florian Fritz, on club duty for the Top 14 playoffs. (Jean-Marcellin Buttin was also on club duty but no additional player was called to replace him as Brice Dulin filled the full-back position.)

Test Matches

First Test

Second Test

Touring squad

Philippe Saint-André announced his 28-man France squad for the June tour to Argentina. Several key faces were rested, including captain Thierry Dusautoir.
 Caps updated before the June tour. Ages are as of the first Test on 16 June.

Head coach: Philippe Saint-André

Note*: After he sustained an injury in the First Test, Yvan Watremez was replaced in the squad by Thomas Domingo. (Philippe Saint-André originally planned to call up Castres prop Yannick Forestier but the latter was touring Japan with the French Barbarians and no satisfactory travel arrangement could be made, hence prompting the return of Domingo in the French squad after he sustained an important injury prior to the 2011 Rugby World Cup which prevented him from taking part in the competition and playing the major part of the 2011-2012 season with his club.)

Note**: Although they took part in the warm-up fixture, Geoffrey Doumayrou, Antoine Guillamon and Romain Martial failed to appear in any of the Tests, thus remaining uncapped at the end of the Tour.

Coaching and Management Team

Home squad

Argentina's 29-man squad named for the 2012 June Tests against Italy and France. Coach Santiago Phelan decided not to select any player involved in the Top 14 playoffs, reserving his best squad for the upcoming 2012 Rugby Championship. Esteban Lozada was a late addition to the squad after his recovery from injury.

Head coach: Santiago Phelan
 Caps updated before tour. Ages are as of the first Test on 16 June.

Note*: Matias Orlando failed to appear in any of the Tests against both Italy and France, thus remaining uncapped at the end of the Tour.

Coaching and Management Team

Aftermath
On 25 June 2012 (after all mid-year Tests had been played) France stood at the 5th place (their best ranking since March 2012) in the IRB Rankings (thanks to their second test comprehensive victory over the Pumas and Wales' loss to Australia in their third test) while Argentina had dropped to the 8th spot (their worst ranking since March 2012).

From August to October 2012, Argentina competed in the inaugural Rugby Championship (the new incarnation of the Tri Nations Series) with Australia, New Zealand and South Africa, finishing bottom of the table with a draw (at home against the Springboks) and five losses. On 8 October 2012 France and Argentina remained respectively at the 5th and 8th places of the IRB World ranking.

As part of the 2012 end of year tests the Pumas toured Wales, France and Ireland, playing one Test against each union. They beat the Welsh but lost to the two other unions while France recorded three straight wins (against Australia, Argentina and Samoa). At the end of their Tests France had climbed to the IRB rankings 4th place, their best ranking since February 2012, while Argentina had dropped to the 9th place, their worst ranking since September 2011. However following the fourth week of Tests (of which Argentina and France were not part) Argentina climbed back to the 8th place thanks to Wales' defeat by Australia over the weekend.

As a result on December 3 for the 2015 Rugby World Cup Pool Draw France was drawn in Pot 1 while Argentina was drawn in Pot 2 and they ended up in Pool D and C respectively, meaning they will not meet before the Quarter Finals.

From February to March 2013, France competed in the Six Nations Championship (the 14th series following this format) with England, Ireland, Scotland, Italy and Wales, finishing bottom of the table with one win (at home against Scotland), a draw (in Ireland) and three losses (at home to Wales, in England and Italy). On 18 March 2013 France has dropped to the 6th place in the IRB rankings while Argentina remained on the 8th place.

As part of the 2013 mid-year tests, France will tour New Zealand in a Three-Test Series while Argentina will host England in a Two-Test Series and Georgia for a one-off Test.

See also
 2012 mid-year rugby test series

References

2012
2012
2012 rugby union tours
Argentina
2012 in Argentine rugby union